The Ambassador from Spain the United States is Spain's foremost diplomatic representative in the United States, and in charge of the Spain's diplomatic mission in the United States. The meaning of the abbreviations can be consulted in the "Notes" section.

Heads of mission (from 1785 to 1951)
 Diego de Gardoqui
 Appointed on 21 May 1785 	
 Title: Charge d’Affaires ad interim
 José Ignacio de Viar
 Title: Secretary of legation. Acted as Charge d’Affaires ad interim from 3 October 1789, to about 1 December 1791, and from April 25 to about 1 August 1796.
 José Ignacio de Viar (2nd) and José de Jáudenes y Nebot
 Title: Commission dated 12 February 1791. Their joint services commenced about 1 December 1791, Mr. Jáudenes began to act independently of Mr. Viar at a period between March 5 and 22 August 1794. He gave notice of intended return to Spain 25 April 1796. Mr. Viar’s services ceased 3 May 1794.
 Charges d’Affaires ad interim
Carlos M. de Irujo
 Appointed on 25 August 1796
 Title: E.E. and M.P.
Valentin de Foronda
 Appointed on 7 July 1807
 Title: Charge d’Affaires a.i.
Luis de Onís.
 Appointed on 7 October 1809
 Title: E.E. and M.P
Mateo de la Serna
 Appointed on 10 May 1819
 Title: Charge d’Affaires a.i.
 Francisco Dionisio Vives 
 Appointed on 12 April 1820
 Title: E.E. and M.P.
 Francisco Hilario Rivas Y Salmon
 Appointed on September 30 October 1821
 Title: Secretary of legation. Acted as Charge d’Affaires a.i.
 Joaquin de Anduaga
 Appointed on 31 October 1821
 Title: E.E. and M.P.
 Francisco Hilario Rivas Y Salmon (2nd)
 Served from 15 March 1825, to 25 July 1827.
 Title: Secretary of legation. Acted as Charge d’Affaires a.i.
 Francisco Tacon
 Appointed on 11 November 1833 
 Title: E.E. and M.P.
 Manuel Tacon
 Served from June 30 to 7 December 1835, and from 4 October 1837 to 28 April 1838.
 Title: Secretary of legation: Acted as Charge d’Affaires ad interim 
 Ángel Calderón de la Barca y Belgrano
 Appointed on 7 December 1835 	
 Title: E.E. and M.P.
 Pedro Aloantara Argaiz
 Appointed on 26 September 1839 	
 Title: E.E. and M.P.
 Fidencio Beurman
 Appointed on 2 January 1844 	
 Title: Charge d’Affaires a.i.
 Ángel Calderón de la Barca y Belgrano(2nd)
 Appointed on 5 August 1844 	
 Title: Minister resident
 Jose Maria Magallon
 Served between 2 August 1855 to 30 May 1854 and from 11 November 1856 to 21 February 1857
 Title: Secretary of legation. Acted as Charge d’Affaires a.i.
 Leopoldo Augusto de cueto
  Appointed on 30 May 1854 
 Title: E.E. and M.P.
 Alfonso Esculante
  Appointed on 1 October 1855 
 Title: E.E. and M.P.
 Gabriel Garcia Y Tassura
  Appointed on 21 February 1857 	
 Title: E.E. and M.P.
Facundo Geni, E. E. and M.P.
 Mauricio Lopez Roberts, E.E. and M.P.
  Appointed on 19 March 1869 
 Admiral Jose Polo de Bernabe
  Appointed on 5 April 1872
  Title: E.E. and M.P.
 Luis de Potestad
  Appointed on 1 July 1874 	
 Title: Charge d’Affaires a.i.
 Antonio Mantilla
  Appointed on 15 September 1874 	
  Title: E.E. and M.P.
Jose Brunetti Y Gayeso
  Appointed on 14 August 1878
  Title: Charge d’Affaires a.i.
Felipe Mendes de Vigo Y Oserio
  Appointed on 3 February 1879
 Title: E.E. and M.P.
Jose Brunetti Y Gayeso
  Appointed on 2 March 1881
 Title: Charge d’Affaires a.i.
 Francisco Barea del Corral
  Appointed on 30 April 1881
 Title: E.E. and M.P.
Enrique Dupuy de Lôme
 Appointed on 29 July 1883
 Title: Charge d’Affaires ad interim
 Juan Valera y Alcalá-Galiano
  Appointed on 29 January 1884
 Title: E.E. and M.P.
Emilio de Muruaga
  Appointed on 6 April 1886
 Title: E.E. and M.P.
 Miguel Saures Guanes
  Appointed on 14 November 1890 	
 Title: E.E. and M.P.
 Jose Felipe Sagrario
  Appointed on 28 November 1891
 Enrique Dupuy de Lôme
 Appointed on 30 September 1892 	
 Title: E.E. and M.P.
Railie de Muruaga
 Appointed on 2 March 1893
 Title: E.E. and M.P.
Jose Felipe Sagrario (2nd)
 Appointed on 16 April 1895
 Title: Charge d’Affaires a.i.
 Enrique Dupuy de Lôme (2nd)
 Appointed on 6 May 1895
 Title: E.E. and M.P.
Juan Du Besu
  Appointed on  11 February 1898
 Title: First secretary and Charge d’Affaires a.i.
 12 March 1898 –
Luis Polo de Bernabe
  Appointed on 20 April 1898
  E.E. and M.P.
 El duque de Arces
  Appointed on 3 June 1899 
 Title: E.E. and M.P.
Juan Riano
  Appointed on 22 November 1901
 Title: Charge d’Affaires a.i.
Emilio de Ojeda
  Appointed on 22 July 1902
Title: E.E. and M.P.
Manuel Walls Y Merino
  Appointed on 11 April 1905
 Title: Charge d’Affaires a.i.
Luis Paster
  Appointed on 30 April 1905
 Title: Charge d’Affaires a.i.
Ramon Pina
  Appointed on 13 March 1907
 Title: E.E. and M.P.
 Luis Pastor
  Appointed on 24 June 1909
 Title: Charge d’Affaires a.i.
Marquis de Villalebar
  Appointed on 31 July 1909
 Title: E.E. and M.P.
Francisco de Zea Bermudes
  Appointed on 10 February 1910
 Title: Charge d’Affaires a.i.
  Juan Riano Y Gayanges
  Appointed on 24 May 1910
 Title: E.E. and M.P.
 Juan Riano Y Gayanges (2nd)
  Appointed on 1 December 1913
 Title: E.E. and M.P.
Mariane Ameede Y Galarmondi
  Appointed on 23 August 1926
 Title: Charge d’Affaires a.i.
 Eduardo Garcia Comin
  Appointed on 21 September 1926
 Title: Consular of Embassy
Alejandro Padilla Y Bell
  Appointed on 11 October 1926
 Title: A.E. and P.
Count de Montefuerte
  Appointed on 15 April 1931
 Title: Charge d’Affaires a.i.
Salvador de Madariaga, A.E. and P.
  Appointed on 30 June 1931
Juan Francisco de Cardenas
  Appointed on 7 March 1932
 Title: A.E. and P.
Luis Calderon
  Appointed on 14 June 1934
 Title: A.E. and P.
Enrique de la Casa
 Appointed on 11 September 1936
 Title: Charge d’Affaires a.i.
 Fernandez de los Rios
  Appointed on 20 October 1936
 Title: A.E. and P.
 Juan Francisco de Cardenas (2nd)
  Appointed on 3 April 1939
 Title: Charge d’Affaires a.i.
Juan Francisco de Cardenas (3rd)
  Appointed on 6 June 1939
 Title: A.E. and P.
German Baraibar
  Appointed on 19 August 1946
 Title: Minister Plenipotentiary; Charge d’Affaires a.i.
Eduardo Propper de Callejón
  Appointed on 20 September 1949
 Title: Minister Plenipotentiary, Charge d’Affaires a.i.
 Jose Felix de Lequerica y Erquiza
 Appointed on 17 January 1951
 Title: A.E. and P.

Kingdom of Spain
(From first published Diplomatic List – Nov. 1893)
E. de Muruaga
  Appointed on  2 March 1893 (Envoy Extraordinary and Minister Plenipotentiary)
 Title: E.E. and M.P.
 Enrique Dupuy de Lôme
  Appointed on 6 May 1895 	
  Title: E.E. and M.P.
  Juan Du Bosc
  Appointed on March 1898
  Title: Charge d'Affaires a.i.
Luis Polo de Bernabe
  Appointed on 12 March 1898
  Title: E.E. and M.P.
 In May 1898 the Legation was removed
 In May 1899 the Legation replaced
Duke de Arcos
  Appointed on 3 June 1899
 Title: E.E. and M.P.
Emilio de Ojeda
  Appointed on August 1902  
Title: E.E. and M.P.
  Appointed on 23 October 1902
Bernardo Jacinto de Cologan
  Appointed June 1905  
 Title: E.E. and M.P. (Apparently never received by President)
 Ramón Pina
  Appointed on February 1907
 Title: E.E. and M.P.
The Marquis of Villalobar
  Appointed on 31 July 1909
 Title: E.E. and M.P.
 Juan Riaño y Gayangos
  Appointed on 24 May 1910
 Title: E.E. and M.P.
Legation  becomes embassy
  1 December 1913
 Juan Riaño y Gayangos
  Appointed on 1 December 1913
 Title: Amb. E. and P.
Mariano de Amoedo y Galarmendi
  Appointed on 23 August 1926
 Title: Charge d’Affaires a.i.
Don Alejandro Padilla y Bell
  Appointed on 11 October 1926
 Title: Amb. E. and P.
Count de Montefuerte
  Appointed on 15 April 1931
 Title: Charge d’Affaires a.i.
Salvador de Madariaga
  Appointed on 30 June 1931
 Title: E. and P.
 Juan Francisco de Cardenas
  Appointed on 7 March 1932
 Title: Amb. E & P
 Luis Calderon
  Appointed on 14 June 1934
 Title: Amb. E. and P.
 Enrique Carlos de la Casa, 
  Appointed on 20 October 1936 	
 Title: Charge d’Affaires a.i
In April 1939 the Embassy was removed

National government
National (Franco) government recognized on 1 April 1939
In May 1939 the Embassy was replaced
 Juan Francisco de Cardenas (2nd)
  Appointed on 3 April 1939 	
 Title: Charge d’Affaires (not a.i.)
Juan Francisco de Cardenas (3rd)
  Appointed on 23 May 1939
 Title: Amb. E. and P.
German Baraibar
  Appointed on 19 August 1946
 Title: Charge d'Affaires a.i
 Eduardo Propper de Callejon
 Appointed on 20 September 1949
 Title: Charge d'Affaires a.i
 Jose Felix de Lequerica
  Appointed on 5 January 1951
 Title: Amb. E. and P.
  Jose Maria Areilza, Count of Motrico
  Appointed on 2 November 1954 	
 Title: Amb. E. and P.
Mariano Yturralde y Orbegoso
  Appointed on 4 August 1960
 Title: Ambassador Extraordinary and Plenipotentiary
Antonio Garrigues  y Diaz Canabate
  Appointed on 1 June 1962
 Title: Ambassador Extraordinary and Plenipotentiary
Alfonso Merry del Val y Alzola, Marques de Merry del Val
  Appointed on 21 April 1964
 Jaime Arguelles
  Appointed on 26 January 1970 
 Title: Amb. E. and P.
Angel Sagaz (died 6 May 1974)
  Appointed on 7 March 1972
 Title: Amb. E. and P.
Joaquin Cervino
  Appointed on 6 May 1974
 Title: Minister Counselor, Charge d'Affaires ad interim
Jaime Alba Delibes 
  Appointed on 7 August 1974
 Title: Amb. E. and P.
 Juan Jose Rovira y Sanchez-Herrera
  Appointed on 29 November 1976
Jose Llado y Fernandez-Urrutia
  Appointed on 27 July 1978
 Title: Amb. E. & P.
Nuno Aguirre de Carcer y Lopez de Sagredo
  Appointed on 20 September 1982
 Title: Amb. E. and P.
Gabriel Manueco de Lecea. Amb. E. and P.
 Appointed on 31 March 1983
Julian Santamaria Ossorio
  Appointed on 31 March 1987
Jaime de Ojeda y Eiseley
  Appointed on 17 April 1990
Antonio de Oyarzabal
  Appointed on 28 August 1996
Francisco Javier Ruperez Rubio
  Appointed on  2 August 2000
Carlos Westendorp
  Appointed on 12 August 2004
Jorge Dezcallar de Mazarredo
  Appointed on 21 August 2008
Ramon Gil-Casares Satrustegui
  Appointed on 5 June 2012
 Pedro Morenés
  Appointed on 24 March 2017
Santiago Cabanas
Appointed on 7 September 2018

Notes
Key to abbreviations:
 [Amb.] E.E. and M.P.= Envoy Extraordinary and Minister Plenipotentiary
 [Charge d'Affaires] a.i.= ad interim
 Amb. E. & P. = Ambassador Extraordinary and Plenipotentiary

See also
Spain – United States relations
Foreign relations of Spain
List of ambassadors of the United States to Spain

References
This page includes public domain text from the US State Department.

United States
Spain